Eremias roborowskii  is a species of lizard endemic to China. It is sometimes considered a subspecies of Eremias velox.

References

Eremias
Reptiles described in 1912
Taxa named by Jacques von Bedriaga